Carbidopa/levodopa/entacapone, sold under the brand name Stalevo among others, is a dopaminergic fixed-dose combination medication that contains carbidopa, levodopa, and entacapone for the treatment of Parkinson's disease. It is marketed by Swiss-based Novartis Pharmaceuticals and manufactured by Finnish drugmaker Orion Corporation.

Medical uses
Carbidopa/levodopa/entacapone was approved by the U.S. Food and Drug Administration (FDA) in June 2003 to treat adults with Parkinson's disease of unknown cause in two scenarios. First, to substitute with equivalent strength of each of the three components for immediate-release carbidopa/levodopa and entacapone previously administered as individual products. Second, to replace immediate-release carbidopa/levodopa therapy (without entacapone) when people experience the signs and symptoms of end-of-dose "wearing-off" but only for people taking a total daily dose of levodopa of 600 mg or less and not experiencing dyskinesias.

It may help decrease a change of response to Parkinson's medications.

In the European Union it is indicated for the treatment of adults with Parkinson's disease and end-of-dose motor fluctuations not stabilized on levodopa/dopa decarboxylase (DDC) inhibitor treatment.

Side effects
Sometimes a wearing off effect may occur at the end of the dosing interval, where a patient may feel Parkinson's symptoms. Urine, saliva, or sweat may be discolored (dark color such as red, brown, or black) after taking carbidopa/levodopa/entacapone.

Prostate cancer
On March 31, 2010, the United States Food and Drug Administration (FDA) stated it was evaluating long-term clinical data from STRIDE-PD which found that a greater number of patients taking Stalevo had prostate cancer compared to those taking carbidopa/levodopa. Other controlled clinical trials evaluating carbidopa/levodopa/entacapone or entacapone did not find an increased risk of prostate cancer. FDA is still reviewing the available information and has not concluded that carbidopa/levodopa/entacapone increases the risk of developing prostate cancer. Healthcare professionals were advised to be aware of this possible risk and follow current guidelines for prostate cancer screening. FDA recommended that healthcare professionals follow the recommendations in the drug label when prescribing carbidopa/levodopa/entacapone and Comtan. Patients were directed to not stop taking their medication unless directed to do so by their healthcare professional.

Cardiovascular risks
On August 20, 2010, the United States Food and Drug Administration stated meta-analysis of several studies "appeared to show an increase in the risk of heart attack, stroke, and cardiovascular death for people taking the drug" but also stated "findings were not clear." Heart problems are not uncommon in Parkinson's patients and the FDA will investigate the concerns.

Drug interactions
Carbidopa/levodopa/entacapone is contraindicated in patients taking a class of antidepressant drugs known as non-selective monoamine oxidase (MAO) inhibitors such as phenelzine and tranylcypromine. Combining carbidopa/levodopa/entacapone with these drugs could cause serious—possibly life-threatening—side effects. MAO inhibitors should be stopped at least two weeks before starting therapy with carbidopa/levodopa/entacapone.

Carbidopa/levodopa/entacapone may be combined with the drugs rasagiline or selegiline. These drugs are a different type of MAO inhibitor known as selective MAO inhibitors that are often prescribed for Parkinson's disease. Many drug interactions involving selegiline are theoretical, primarily based on interactions with non-selective MAO inhibitors; at oral doses the risk of these interactions may be very low. However, transdermal selegiline, known by its trade name Emsam, is still contraindicated. Transdermal selegiline results in higher plasma levels at which it behaves like a non-selective MAO inhibitor. Concominant use of entacapone, a component of carbidopa/levodopa/entacapone, with MAO inhibitors may increase toxicity of MAO inhibitors. Levodopa, also a component of carbidopa/levodopa/entacapone, in combination with MAO inhibitors may result in hypertensive reactions.

Mechanism of action

Levodopa is the immediate precursor to dopamine. Entacapone is a selective, reversible catechol-O-methyltransferase (COMT) inhibitor that prevents the degradation of levodopa. Entacapone does not cross the blood–brain barrier. Carbidopa is a peripheral aromatic L-amino acid decarboxylase (AADC) inhibitor. Carbidopa, which also does not cross the blood–brain barrier, is combined with levodopa to prevent its conversion to dopamine in the periphery.

Society and culture

Extension

, applications for extending the indication of carbidopa/levodopa/entacapone to people requiring initiation of levodopa therapy have been under review by the European Medicines Agency (EMA) and the U.S. Food and Drug Administration (FDA), based on the favorable results from FIRST-STEP, a study conducted in North America and Europe by Novartis from 2005, to 2007 (see below).

References

External links 
 
 

Antiparkinsonian agents
Combination drugs